The following is a list of nicknames of UEFA national association football teams.

Nicknames
 Nicknames in italics are commonly used in English.

See also
 Glossary of association football terms
 List of men's national association football teams
 List of women's national association football teams

References

Nickname UEFA
National UEFA